Wreck Detectives is the title of two TV documentary series from UK Channel 4 aired in 2003 and 2004 presented by Jeremy Seal, Miranda Krestovnikoff and David Manley.

Series 1 - 2003

Alum Bay wreck, Alum Bay  
Earl of Abergavenny, Weymouth Bay
Mingary Castle wreck, Sound of Mull
HMS Lawford, Normandy
HMS Stirling Castle, Kent
St Peter Port wrecks, Guernsey
HMS Swan, Sound of Mull
HMS Hazardous, The Solent

Series 2 - 2004

Resurgam, Colwyn Bay
Bronze Bell, Cardigan Bay
Sunderland flying boat, Milford Haven
Hope, Chesil Beach, Dorset
U-boat B-65, Padstow
Lelia, Liverpool
Great Lewis, Waterford
HMS Pylades, Normandy

DVD release

Wreck Detectives Series 1 was released on DVD in 2005 containing all 8 episodes

External links

Channel 4 home page

Channel 4 documentary series
2003 British television series debuts
2004 British television series endings